Karen Dior (February 14, 1967 – August 25, 2004) was the stage name of Geoffrey Gann, an American actress, singer, director, and drag queen.

Life and career
Karen Dior was born Geoffrey Gann in Missouri; She was adopted as an infant into a Southern Baptist family, and was raised in that religious tradition. Gann moved to Los Angeles at the age of 21 and began working in a beauty salon and performing in drag shows in West Hollywood bars. In 1989, She began appearing in bisexual and transgender adult films. She performed in approximately 120 adult films, most of them under the Dior name. She also performed under the names Geoff Dior, Rick Van, Geoffrey Karen Dior, Geoffrey Gann, and Geoff Gann.

In the 1990s, Dior moved into mainstream film and television roles, including a performance as Loni Anderson's stalker in the 1992 TV movie The Price She Paid. Other work included guest appearances on the television series Xena: Warrior Princess, Head Over Heels, and Veronica's Closet.

Later years and death
Dior contracted HIV in 1995 and later worked as an AIDS activist. After leaving the adult film industry, Dior wrote and released Sleeping Under the Stars, her first autobiographical work, in 2001. The same year, she released an album (under the name Geoffrey Karen Dior) titled S E X, and she was a member of two bands, the Johnny Depp Clones and Goddess. She also received a PhD in philosophy in religion and became an ordained minister.

On August 25, 2004, Dior died of hepatitis.

Selected filmography

Actress
 Single White Shemale (1992)
 Mystery Date (1992)
 A River Made to Drown In (1997)
 Xena: Warrior Princess (1 episode, 1997 – "Here She Comes... Miss Amphipolis")
 Head Over Heels (1 episode, 1997)
 Veronica's Closet (1 episode, 1998)
 Double Down (2001)

Director
 I Dream Of Queenie (1997) "Produced and Directed"
 Genderella (1998)
 Playing the Odds (1998)
 Getting Personal (1999)
 Bi Athletes (2000)
 Bi-Dazzled (2001)
 Leather Temptation (2002)
 Bi-Sluts (2001) "2001 AVN Bisexual Nominated Adult Film"

Bibliography
 Sleeping Under the Stars (2001)

References

External links

 

21st-century American male writers
HIV/AIDS activists
AIDS-related deaths in California
American dance musicians
American male film actors
20th-century American memoirists
American pornographic film directors
American male pornographic film actors
American male television actors
Bisexual male pornographic film actors
Directors of gay pornographic films
Directors of transgender pornographic films
Deaths from hepatitis
LGBT memoirists
American LGBT musicians
LGBT people from Missouri
American LGBT writers
Pornographic film actors from Missouri
Actors in transgender pornographic films
1967 births
2004 deaths
20th-century American singers
American male non-fiction writers
21st-century American non-fiction writers
20th-century American male actors
LGBT Protestant clergy
American drag queens
20th-century American male writers
20th-century American LGBT people